Ať se dobré děje (Whatever happens, Come the Good) is the fifth studio album by Slovak vocalist Szidi Tobias released on Studio DVA in 2011.

Track listing

Credits and personnel

 Szidi Tobias - lead vocal
 Milan Vyskočáni - music
 Peter Lipovský - lyrics
 Martin Gašpar - guitar
 Martina Zajko - guitar

 Marcel Buntaj - drums
 Andrej Szabo - percussion
 Michal Hrubý - producer
 Pavla Hodková - photography

Charts

References

General
 
 
Specific

External links 
 SzidiTobias.cz > Discography > Ať se dobré děje

2011 albums
Szidi Tobias albums